Richard Stanley Brodowski (July 26, 1932 – January 14, 2019) was a professional baseball pitcher, who played in Major League Baseball (MLB) for the Boston Red Sox, Washington Senators, and Cleveland Indians in 1952 and from 1955 to 1959.

Brodowski attended Sweeney Senior High School (now Bayonne High School).

Early life
Brodowski was born in Bayonne, New Jersey, on July 26, 1932. His father, Andrew Brodowski, had emigrated to the United States from Poland at about age 10 to 12, and worked as a lead burner in an oil refinery. His mother, Anna, came from Poland when she was around five. "I remember them talking about how they used to bring the family from Europe to the United States," Dick recalled in a 2016 interview. Did they speak Polish in the home at Bayonne? "Just a little. Just when they wanted to get stuff by the kids." Dick had two older brothers, John and Henry. At the time of the 1940 census, John was 19 and employed as a welder in an iron works. Dick grew up in the city and graduated from Sweeney Senior High School, playing baseball – initially shortstop – in CYO ball and high school, and at least four professional organizations scouted him. Brodowski was signed by Boston Red Sox scout Bill McCarren.

Baseball career

Minor leagues
That season — along with playing 74 games at third (with a batting average of .276) — Brodowski won 21 games (in 26 decisions), while playing for the Marion Red Sox, in the Class D Ohio–Indiana League.

In , after being promoted all the way up to the Triple-A American Association Louisville Colonels, Brodowski went 7–1 in ten starting assignments with seven complete games, all of which quickly earned him a call up to the big league team.

Major leagues
Brodowski made his MLB debut with the Red Sox, on June 14, 1952, at the tender age of 19. In 20 games pitched (12 of them as a starter), he posted a respectable 5–5 record and 4.41 earned run average (ERA), while notching four complete games. One of those early victories was a 4-hit, 4–3 triumph against the American League (AL) champion New York Yankees, prompting none other than perennial All-Star Hall of Fame catcher Yogi Berra to comment as to Brodowski's own impending potential for stardom. Brodowski accomplished this while taking his turn every fifth day, in a much-venerated pitching rotation which included Mel Parnell, Mickey McDermott, Dizzy Trout, and Sid Hudson; however, Brodowski spent 1953–54 in military service, in the US Army, stationed stateside at Fort Dix, New Jersey, during the Korean War period. Upon his  return to baseball, Brodowski became largely ineffective. He would spend just one more season with Boston, going 1–0 with a 5.63 ERA, before being traded to the Washington Senators, along with minor league pitcher Al Curtis, outfielder Neil Chrisley, pitcher Tex Clevenger, and outfielder Karl Olson, for pitcher Bob Porterfield, pitcherJohnny Schmitz, outfielder Tom Umphlett, and first sacker Mickey Vernon, on November 8, 1955.

After just  seasons in our nation's capitol, Brodowski was again traded — this time to the Cleveland Indians — along with outfielder Dick Tettelbach, in exchange for outfielder Bob Usher, on May 15, 1957. Brodowski's last major league pitching appearance came in July , with his active professional career coming to an end while pitching for the Eastern League Reading Indians (Reading, Pennsylvania), early in the  campaign.

In his six-season, 72-game MLB career, Brodowski's stat line included a 9–11 record with five complete games. He also posted five saves, 85 strikeouts, and a 4.76 ERA, in  innings pitched. Brodowski allowed 212 base hits and eight hit batsmen, while issuing 124 bases on balls.

Personal life and death
After concluding his baseball career, Brodowski was a salesman for Metropolitan Life Insurance. He then worked at the Boston engineering firm of Stone & Webster, in the security department, until his retirement.

Brodowski died on January 14, 2019, in Lynn, Massachusetts.

References

External links

Dick Brodowski at SABR (Baseball BioProject)
Dick Brodowski at Baseball Almanac
Dick Brodowski at Baseball Library

1932 births
2019 deaths
American people of Polish descent
Baseball players from New Jersey
Bayonne High School alumni
Boston Red Sox players
Cleveland Indians players
Leones de Ponce players
Louisville Colonels (minor league) players
Major League Baseball pitchers
Marion Red Sox players
Reading Indians players
San Diego Padres (minor league) players
Sportspeople from Bayonne, New Jersey
Sportspeople from Lynn, Massachusetts
Toronto Maple Leafs (International League) players
Washington Senators (1901–1960) players
American expatriate baseball players in Canada
American expatriate baseball players in Cuba